The 1985 Pan Pacific Open was a women's tennis tournament played on indoor carpet courts in Tokyo, Japan that was part of the Category 4 tier of the 1985 Virginia Slims World Championship Series. It was the 10th edition of the tournament and was held from 9 December through 15 December 1985. Third-seeded Manuela Maleeva won her second consecutive singles title at the event.

Finals

Singles
 Manuela Maleeva defeated   Bonnie Gadusek 7–6, 3–6, 7–5
 It was Maleeva's 1st title of the year and the 6th of her career.

Doubles
 Claudia Kohde-Kilsch /  Helena Suková defeated  Marcella Mesker /  Elizabeth Smylie 6–0, 6–4

References

External links
 ITF tournament edition details
 Tournament draws

Pan Pacific Open
Pan Pacific Open
Pan Pacific Open
Pan Pacific Open
Pan Pacific Open